The Urtene, also called the Urtenenbach is a river in the Swiss Canton of Bern. It drains a portion of the central Bernese Midland and belongs to the catchment area of the Rhine.

References

External links
Ökologische Beurteilung des Flusslaufs der Urtene (pdf)1995
GUTHRUF, J. et al. Renaturierung Urtene Holzmühle 2004-2007, Erfolgskontrolle 2008(pdf)2009

Rivers of Switzerland
Rivers of the canton of Bern
Tributaries of the Emme